When setting photoflash exposures, the guide number (GN) of photoflash devices (flashbulbs and electronic devices known as "studio strobes", "on-camera flashes", "electronic flashes", "flashes", and "speedlights") is a measure photographers can use to calculate either the required fstop for any given flash-to-subject distance, or the required distance for any given fstop. To solve for either of these two variables, one merely divides a device's guide number by the other.

Though guide numbers are influenced by a variety of variables, their values are presented as the product of only two factors as follows:

Guide number = f-number × distance

This simple inverse relationship holds true because the brightness of a flash declines with the square of the distance, but the amount of light admitted through an aperture decreases with the square of the f-number. Accordingly, as illustrated at right, a guide number can be factored to a small fnumber times a long distance just as readily as a large fnumber times a short distance.

Guide numbers are not an absolute measure of flash power (a property called luminous energy) because they are influenced by other variables, notably the camera's ISO setting (film speed) and flash coverage angle. For any given ISO setting and coverage angle however, an inherently more powerful flash device featuring a guide number that is, for instance, twice as great will permit subjects to be properly exposed from twice as far away for any given fstop, or conversely, will permit scenes at a given distance to be properly exposed at an fnumber twice as great.

The guide number system, which manufacturers adopted after consistent-performing mass-produced flashbulbs became available in the late 1930s, has become nearly superfluous due to the ubiquity of electronic photoflash devices featuring variable flash output and automatic exposure control, as well as digital cameras, which make it trivially easy, quick, and inexpensive to adjust exposures and try again. Still, guide numbers in combination with flash devices set to manual exposure mode remain valuable in a variety of circumstances, such as when unusual or exacting results are required and when shooting non-average scenery.

Different models of flash devices available on the market have widely varying maximum-rated guide numbers. Since guide numbers are so familiar to photographers, they are near-universally used by manufacturers of on-camera flash devices to advertise their products' relative capability. However, such a practice demands industry-wide standardization of both the ISO setting and illumination angle underlying the ratings; this has only been partially realized. For the most part, manufacturers state guide numbers relative to a sensitivity of ISO 100. However, manufacturers sometimes rate guide numbers at ISO 200, which makes them 41% greater. Furthermore, the illumination angles underlying manufacturers' ratings vary greatly, which can make it particularly difficult to compare models.

Understanding guide numbers

Units of measure 

Throughout most of the world where the metric system (SI) is observed, guide numbers are expressed as a unitless numeric value like 34, even though they are technically a composite unit of measure that is a two-factor product:  As such, guide numbers can be reduced either to distance in meters or to fstops depending on how one uses the guide number in a calculation.

In the U.S. however, photographers typically measure distances in feet and require guide numbers scaled accordingly. To serve the U.S. market, manufacturers of flash devices typically provide foot-based guide numbers and add nomenclature such as feet, ft, or the foot symbol ( ′ ) to unambiguously denote that fact, e.g. Guide number: 92′. Another common practice when flash devices are marketed in the U.S. is to provide two guide numbers—which can be expressed in a variety of formats—so distances and fnumbers may be calculated using either feet or meters, e.g. Guide number: 

Though nomenclature conventions such as these can make guide numbers misleadingly appear to be length-based units of measure, they serve as notations to eliminate ambiguity as to which length-based system of measurement underlies the guide numbers. As with metric-based guide numbers, foot-based guide numbers are a two-factor unit of measure except the units are 

To convert a guide number given in meters to feet, divide by 0.3048. To convert a guide number given in feet to meters, multiply by 0.3048.

Calculating with guide numbers 
It is easy to use guide numbers to calculate either an aperture or a flash-to-subject distance. Consider a flash device with a rating of 28 meters (which might be marked "92 feet", "28 DIN", "28/92", "92", etc.).

Thus, a subject 11 meters or 36 feet away will be correctly illuminated  = 11 m, and  = 36 ft).

Alternatively, if one has an established flash-to-subject distance and wants to find the required f-number, one divides the guide number by the distance.

Example for finding a distance
The flash device must be 10 meters (33 feet) from the subject.
In metric: GN 28 ÷  = 10 m
In U.S. customary units: GN 92 ÷  = 33 ft

Example for finding an aperture
Suppose a photographer's flash-to-subject distance is 9.75 meters (32 feet) and the guide number is 39 (m) / 128 (ft). The aperture must be .
In metric: GN 39 ÷ 9.75 m = 
In U.S. customary units: GN 128 ÷ 32 ft =

Details 
The magnitude of guide numbers is a function of the following four variables:
 The total luminous energy (in lumen⋅seconds) emitted by the flash head (which is itself the product of the duration and the average luminous flux of a flash). See Glossary, below for illumination terminology.
 The solid angle subtended by the circular- or rectangular-profile beam as it leaves the flash head (the average of the beam's X- and Y-axis angles).
 The ISO sensitivity setting.
 Filters (either on the flash or on the camera lens). See Effect of filters, below.

The above variables fall into two classes that influence the magnitude of guide numbers:

 Those that affect the non-distance-related intensity of a flash arriving at a scene (a property called illuminance, measured in lux) or its duration; namely its power setting, flash coverage angle, and color gels in front of the flash head.
 Those that affect the camera's non-aperture-related light sensitivity; namely lens filters and the ISO rating of the film/imaging sensor.

Changing either the fstop or the flash-to-subject distance does not affect guide numbers because, by definition, choosing a different value for one factor is automatically accompanied by a reciprocal adjustment in the other.

Most modern flash devices can operate at guide numbers less than their maximum ratings via either manual adjustment of their power settings in binned steps, by an in-flash automatic light sensing feature, or by being cued by the camera's sensor; both the latter options make continuously variable adjustments.

Shutter speeds do not factor into guide number calculations with electronic flash and, for the most part, have no effect on exposures. See Effect of shutter speeds, below.

Guide numbers are not affected by scene reflectance. Guide numbers are a function of the illuminance and duration of a flash (a property called luminous exposure that have lux⋅seconds as their units of measure) arriving at a scene as measured by an incident-light meter (pictured at right), not the amount leaving the scene. This often seems counterintuitive to hobbyists who incorrectly assume that cameras' built-in reflected-light meters are a definitive measure of exposure. However, this principle underlies why using a camera with a through-the-lens meter to photograph a park bench surrounded by sunlit snow underexposes the image, making the bench appear nearly black and the snow as dark as grass and foliage. This is because reflected-light meters are calibrated for an average scene reflectance of 18 percent and can’t "know" when a scene has non-average reflectance. See also Gray card and Light meter.

Guide number distances are always measured from the flash device to the subject; if the flash device is detached from the camera, the position of the camera is irrelevant. Furthermore, unless a flash device has an automatic zoom feature that follows the setting of a camera's zoom lens, guide numbers do not vary with the focal length of lenses.

Note that manufacturers of flash devices may provide guide numbers ratings specified relative to ISO 200, which increases them by the square root of the difference, or a 41 percent increase relative to those given at ISO 100. See Effect of ISO sensitivity, below. When comparing or shopping for flash devices, it is important to ensure that the guide numbers are given in the same ISO sensitivity, are for the same coverage angle, and reduce to the same unit of distance (meters or feet). When these three variables have been normalized, guide numbers can serve as an relative measure of intrinsic illuminating energy rather than an inconstant metric for calculating exposures.

Effect of power settings 
Most modern electronic flash devices have manually adjustable power settings. Moreover, virtually all modern on-camera flash devices that have manually adjustable power settings also provide either a built-in mechanical circular calculator (such as shown in the photo at the top of this article) or a digital display that automatically shows the effect power levels have on fstop and distance (guide number).

Nevertheless, for those who want to master the math, guide numbers diminish from their full-power ratings as the square root of their fractional setting per the following formula:

…where
 is the numerator in the fraction of the power setting
 is the denominator in the fraction of the power setting

The following is a step-by-step example of using the above formula: Suppose your full-power guide number is 48 (it is irrelevant if it is scaled for meters or feet for this purpose) and the flash device is set to  power. Divide 1 by 16 to obtain 0.0625. Take the square root of that (the  button on a calculator), which equals 0.25, and multiply that by the guide number of 48 to obtain a reduced-power guide number of 12.0.

The mathematical relationship between guide numbers and power levels can also be understood using the below alternative formula, which is suitable whenever the numerator in the fractional power setting is 1 (which is usually the case with flash devices):

…where
 is the denominator in the fraction of the power setting

Example: Suppose your full-power guide number is 51 and your flash device is set to  power. Take the square root of 32 (the  button on a calculator), which equals approximately 5.657. Divide 51 by 5.657 to obtain a reduced-power guide number of 9.0.

Effect of flash angle (zoom setting) 
Many flash devices have auto- or manual-adjust zoom features that permit the illumination angle to be widened (lessening the guide number) to fully illuminate the image area of wide-angle lenses, or narrowed (increasing the guide number) for telephoto lenses. Such coverage angles may be given in degrees but are often expressed as being equivalent to lens focal lengths for full-frame, 35 mm cameras. Manufacturers' advertising practices vary as to the angle of coverage underlying their guide number ratings, in large part because some flash devices can be zoomed whereas others are fixed.

Virtually all modern on-camera flash devices with zoomable flash heads also have either a built-in mechanical circular calculator (such as shown in the photo at the top of this article) or a digital display; both automatically show the effect zoom levels have on fstop and distance (guide number).

Nonetheless, when comparing or shopping for flash devices with zoom heads, it would certainly be helpful if it were possible to mathematically convert advertised guide numbers from one manufacturer's flash angle (zoom level) to another manufacturer's flash angle. This is because guide numbers are often—though not always—given at their most zoomed setting and not all flash devices can zoom to the same extent.

Unfortunately, the optics of flash heads are complex; each manufacture's designs not only have illumination areas that are slightly different, but are the product of differing relative proportions of transmission, diffusion, reflection, and refraction among their optical elements (flash tube, reflector, Fresnel lens, and add-on wide-angle adapter). Accordingly, there is no universal formula for precisely calculating how guide numbers diminish from, for instance, a 105 mm setting to 50 mm or 35 mm settings. One may consult the users guide for a specific flash device to obtain guide numbers for different zoom settings.

The below table illustrates the variation in guide numbers depending on zoom level for some select, relatively high-power zoom-capable flash devices.

Note A: Flash angle is equivalent to the denoted lens focal length for a full-frame 35 mm camera.

Effect of ISO sensitivity 

Among other variables like illumination angle (for devices with zoomable flash heads) and power setting, guide numbers are a function of the ISO sensitivity (film speed or ISO setting on a digital camera). Guide numbers change as the square root of the difference in ISO sensitivity. Accordingly, a greater ISO sensitivity yields a greater guide number.

To allow photographers to properly calculate exposures, even older, base-model flash devices have at least a tabular table on the device showing its guide number for a limited range of common ISO sensitivities. Today, the state of the art has advanced so that with the exception of the least expensive models, virtually all modern on-camera flash devices feature either a built-in mechanical circular calculator (such as shown in the photo at the top of this article) or—more modern yet—a digital display; both methods automatically calculate the effect ISO settings have on fstop and distance (guide number). Such features make it exceedingly easy to find a suitable combination of fstop and distance so photographers seldom need to concern themselves with the mathematical details underlying how their flash devices' guide number changes with different ISO sensitivities.

Still, it can be helpful when comparing flash devices to understand how guide numbers vary with ISO sensitivity. Usually manufacturers state their products' guide number ratings relative to an ISO sensitivity of 100. However, some manufacturers of flash devices may provide guide numbers ratings specified relative to ISO 200, which increases its guide number by 41 percent relative to those given at ISO 100.

The below table shows the proportional change in a flash device's guide number relative to both ISO 100 and ISO 200.

Note that the extremely high guide numbers shown in the right-hand portion of the table have a limited real-world ability to extend flash distances. As the above photo illustrates, the fnumber × distance reciprocal relationship breaks down when on-camera flash devices that are set to full or near-full power are used in combination with cameras set to very high ISO sensitivities and large apertures (exceedingly long distances). ISO settings like 102,400 can yield guide numbers in excess of 1220 (m) / 4000 (ft) that seldom if ever permit extremely long-range flash photography due to particulates and aerosols typically present in outside air that fog images with haze glare and attenuate the reach of the light. Except in unusual atmospheric conditions, extraordinarily large guide numbers will produce suitable results only by either positioning the flash device off-axis from the camera by a fair distance or by shooting at the smallest apertures.

Note B: The ISO sensitivities shown in this table are their common nomenclature values; their actual underlying values may be slightly different, such as ISO 250, which is actually approximately 252.

Effect of filters 
Filters reduce guide numbers regardless of whether they are gels placed over the flash device or are lens filters on the camera. Flash devices may come with detachable color-correction gels or filters to match the color of the flash with different types of ambient lighting such as incandescent and fluorescent. Some modern flash devices can even detect when color-correction gels have been attached and automatically compensate for their effect on guide numbers.

Unless a hot shoe-mounted electronic flash device's power can be controlled by a camera via through-the-lens metering (TTL), guide numbers must be manually compensated for the effect of on-lens filters. For instance a typical polarizing filter, which attenuates 1–1.5 fstops, will diminish guide numbers to 71–60% of their unfiltered rating.

Guide numbers diminish as the square root of filter attenuation in fstops, as per the following formula:

…where  equals the filter's rated loss in fstops.

The following is a step-by-step example of using the above formula: Suppose your guide number is 32 (it is irrelevant if it is scaled for meters or feet for this purpose) and the rated filter loss is 1.5 fstops. Take 0.5 and raise it to the power of 1.5 (using the  button on a scientific calculator), which equals roughly 0.35355. Take the square root of that (the  button), which equals approximately 0.595, and multiply that by the guide number of 32 to obtain a filtered guide number of 19.0.

The below table provides some common filter values.

When a flash device is set to manual (M) or automatic (A) exposure mode and is not being controlled via the camera's through-the-lens metering, a convenient way to compensate for the effect of a lens-mounted filter is to set the ISO rating on a camera to a higher value than the flash device. For instance, if a polarizing filter attenuates by 1 fstop and the flash device is set to ISO 100, then the camera can simply be set to ISO 200. The extra camera sensitivity compensates for the loss due to the filter.

The formula governing this relationship is as follows:

…where  equals the camera filter's rated loss in fstops.

Here is a step-by-step example of using this formula: Suppose a filter attenuates by 11/3 fstops and the flash device is set to ISO 100. Take 2 and raise it to the power of 1.3333 (using the  button on a scientific calculator), which is approximately 2.5198, and then multiply that by 100, which equals about 252. The nearest standard camera setting is ISO 250.

Effect of shutter speeds

With electronic flash 
When electronic flash devices based on flashtube technology are used with most modern cameras (those with focal-plane shutters), shutter speed has no effect on guide numbers. See also Shutter (photography).

This is because even at the most powerful settings, flash durations seldom exceed a few milliseconds (thousandths of a second). With focal-plane shutters, a flash begins shortly after the shutter curtain has fully opened and must extinguish before the curtain begins to close. When this happens, an underexposed, gradated band appears along an edge of the image—often trailing off darker towards the left or bottom, as seen in the photo at top right.

Conversely, longer exposures also have no effect on guide number. After the flash has extinguished, longer shutter speeds will only increase the contribution from continuous ambient light, which can lead to ghosting with moving subjects. See also Flash synchronization.

With flashbulbs 
Shutter speeds used to (and still do today) influence guide numbers when using flashbulbs due to their relatively long flash durations. Vintage flashbulbs, though no longer made, are still available and have a niche following, largely because even medium-size bulbs such as the once-popular General Electric Synchro-Press  had huge light outputs on the order of 23,000 lumen⋅seconds—far exceeding the most powerful of today's hot shoe-mounted electronic flash devices. With peak powers often between one and two million lumens, many young baby boomers chased after fairylike retinal bleached spots (a symptom of flash blindness) for minutes after having their pictures taken at close distance with flashbulbs of the era.

If one wanted the benefit of all the light produced by a flashbulb (highest possible guide number), relatively long exposure times were required because most flashbulbs didn't stop producing useful amounts of light until 20–90 milliseconds (ms) after electrical current was applied. The GE  flashbulb for instance, was a Class M (medium peak) bulb, which were designed to produce peak luminous fluxes 20 ms after firing (see the graph at lower right). The  was intended for leaf shutter-type cameras and M sync photoflash triggering, which gave M bulbs a head start by delaying the opening of the shutter so any given camera's fastest exposure time would be centered at the 20 ms point (an 18.75 ms delay for instance, for a definitional camera capable of  second exposures, or 2.5 ms). The GE  stopped producing useful amounts of light roughly 50 ms after current was applied.

So long as one used flashbulbs with leaf shutter-type cameras, faster exposures and larger apertures could be used to minimize motion blur or reduce depth of field at the expense of guide number.

Cameras with focal-plane shutters—even if they had PC connectors with X, F, M, or S-sync delays ("xenon sync" with zero delay and flashbulbs with peak delays of 5, 20, and 30 ms)—could not be used at speeds that attenuated guide numbers with most types of flashbulbs because their light curves were characterized by rapid rise and fall rates; the second shutter curtain would begin wiping shut during a period of rapid change in scene illuminance, causing uneven exposure across the image area that varied in nature depending on exposure duration and the type of bulb.

A notable exception to this limitation with focal-plane shutters was when using FP sync in combination with "flat peak" (FP) bulbs, which had  rise times followed by broad, relatively level plateaus in their light output curves. The FP bulbs, like GE's , allowed extraordinary flexibility with shutter speeds, ranging from the slowest speeds on the dial to the fastest where only a narrow slit passed over the film—at the expense of course, of guide number.

Fill flash: Guide numbers vs. distance 
When filling in shadows outdoors, powerful flash devices (those with inherently greater guide numbers when compared at the same ISO sensitivity and coverage angle) can be useful because they permit photographers to increase the maximum flash-to-subject distance, such as when taking group photos. Clearly, more power helps because the sun is such a bright, unadjustable light source against which a flash device must compete.

The tables below show the distances at which deep shadows will be filled with one fstop less than the sunlit portions of the scene, which is a common fill level. The exposures given here assume average frontlit subjects under bright or hazy sun with distinct shadows for photos taken between 2 hours after sunrise and 2 hours before sunset.

As can be seen by referring to the above tables, if a photographer has a camera with an X-sync speed of 1/125 th of a second, is shopping for a flash device, and desires the capability to fill shadows from up to 2.5 meters (8 feet) away, a flash device with a guide number of at least  will be required.

Note that increasing the ISO sensitivity of a digital camera (or choosing a faster film speed) will not increase the distances given in these tables because the extent to which ISO sensitivity affects the exposure in the fill-flash areas of an image will equally affect the sunlit ones. For any given shutter speed, a flash device can only fill shadows to 50% the contribution from the sun out to a certain distance; at a camera's Xsync shutter speed, no change in ISO sensitivity—and accompanying fstop setting—can influence this proportional relationship.

History 

General Electric introduced the guide number system in 1939 concurrently with the introduction of a compact, wire-filled flashbulb called the  This compelling new way of easily and accurately calculating photoflash exposures was quickly adopted by manufacturers of a wide variety of photographic equipment, including flashbulbs, film, cameras, and flashguns.

The first flashbulb was introduced in 1925 and was filled with flash powder. In 1929, Sashalite Limited in London invented the "Sashalite" flashbulb, which was filled with a crumpled wad of aluminum foil so thin (about one-tenth the width of a human hair) it could not be picked up with fingers. The Sashalite, which was manufactured under contract by General Electric Co., Ltd. in London, came with an instruction sheet directing photographers to insert the Sashalite into "an ordinary electric torch" and to set their shutter to either "Bulb" or "Time".<ref group=note>When Sashalite's instructions mentioned setting a shutter to its "Bulb" setting, the company was not referring to glass flashbulbs but to rubber bulbs.  The Sashlite flashbulb was introduced at a time when the equipment typically used for professional indoor portraiture was a large-format studio view camera and a flash-lamp with flash powder in its tray. Advanced hobbyists in 1909—decades before the first flashbulbs—could buy portable folding cameras, made by Conley Camera Company, from Sears Roebuck for $4.75–$21.50 (equivalent to $–$ in ). With the exception of entry-level models, both view-type and folding cameras of this era came with a detachable pneumatic shutter release with a rubber bulb on the end, as seen at right on the $11.75 Model C. With the exception of their entry-level shutter, Conley's shutters—like the Conley Automatic (inset, far right)—had a "B" setting. Though mechanically timed exposures too could be triggered by squeezing the shutter release bulb, "bulb" exposures had the same momentary action as camera shutters have today, as per this description from Sears Roebuck's 1909 Cameras [&] Photographic Supplies, which devoted three pages to the features and operation of Conley's shutters:</span>

The Eastman Kodak Company sold cameras before the flashbulb era too. Though their entry level consumer cameras came without the option of a pneumatic shutter release, Kodak retained the convention of using "B” on shutters for the momentary actuation setting but referred to it as "Brief Time" in brochures for cameras like their Folding Autographic Brownies, as well as in instruction manuals for products like their 1 & 1A Pocket "Kodaks" Juniors. However, apparently assuming photographers using their product would be doing so in a relatively narrow range of distances common to portraiture, made no mention of flash-to-subject distance. The instruction sheet then directed the photographer as follows:

In 1932, Philips introduced what was arguably the first modern flashbulb with wire fill under the trade name "Hydronalium". Philips' technology was licensed in 1937 by Wabash Photolamp Corporation and introduced to the U.S. market as Superflash bulbs. Shortly later, in 1939, General Electric under their MAZDA brand introduced their very successful, golf ball-size, wire-filled, bayonet-base, Midget 

Prior to GE's inverse of the squares innovation, photographers and publications—via tedious trial and error with different flashbulbs and reflectors—generated tables providing a large number of aperture-distance combinations. For instance, a 1940 edition (written too late to incorporate guide numbers) of the Complete Introduction to Photography by the Journal of the Photographic Society of America featured an exposure table for foil-filled flashbulbs, which is shown below. The parenthetical values in bold were not part of the original table; they show the equivalent guide number for each aperture-distance combination.  Note the scatter in the guide number values in each column; the data for the right-most flashbulb setup has over a three-quarter fstop variation from high to low.

Bear in mind that the above table is for only one film speed. For end users, obtaining proper exposures with flashbulbs was an error-prone effort as they mentally interpolated between distances and fstop combinations that weren’t very accurate in the first place. Had the guide number system existed by this point, the above table would not have required the left-most column showing distances and would have required only one row (showing guide numbers) under each heading.

By 1941, two years after GE introduced the guide number system, guide number ratings for products like the GE  were being discussed  in books like Flash in Modern Photography. By 1944, the 16th edition of Wall's Dictionary of Photography featured a guide number table. Perhaps so as to not intimidate readers, that table still showed numerous combinations of distances and apertures, but it also featured a new column showing the guide number that every cell in its row equalled. The guide number system underlying that table drove slightly finer increases, averaging a factor of  each, from one distance to the next (6, 9, 12, 18, and 24 feet) so each step would be accompanied—by definition—by an increase in aperture of precisely one fstop. Not surprisingly, the data scatter was as tight as mathematical rounding to the nearest foot permitted.

By late 1949, authors catering to hobbyists were using guide numbers in articles in a routine fashion, as exemplified by the January 1950 issue of Popular Photography, as follows: 

Upon introducing the new inverse of the squares concept in 1939, General Electric initially referred to the new system as "Flash Numbers". Two years later, Flash in Modern Photography (1941) used the term "guide number" on page 47, on the very next page used the term "Flash Number" (title case), and later still used the term "flash number" (lowercase). Terminology was similarly mixed in the United Kingdom for years after the introduction of the guide number system; circa 1954, "Flash Factor", "Flash number" (and sometimes "Guide number") were in use.

Glossary

See also 
 Exposure (photography)
 Exposure value
 Flash comparison
 Flash (photography)
 Flash synchronization
 Flashtube

Notes

References

Further reading 
 Bryan Peterson, Understanding Flash Photography: How to Shoot Great Photographs Using Electronic Flash, (paperback – August 30, 2011), Amphoto Books,

External links 
 D. 'n' A. Seaver: Conley cameras
 Photographic Memorabilia: Flash Photography ~ History & ILFORD
 Scantips.com: Understanding Flash Guide Numbers, plus guide number Calculator
 Scantips.com: EV – Exposure Value (with EV table and EV calculator)
 Sekonic.com: EV/Lux/FootCandle Conversion Chart 

Flash photography
Photographic lighting
Light sources